La Douze is a commune in the Dordogne department in Nouvelle-Aquitaine in southwestern France. Les Versannes station has rail connections to Périgueux and Agen.

Population

History
The lordship of La Douze was acquired in 1372 by the Abzac family. It was converted to a marquisate in 1615, which lasted until 1943.

On Cassini's map of France between 1756 and 1789, the village is identified by the name Ladouze.

See also
Communes of the Dordogne department

References

Communes of Dordogne